is one of the seven wards of the city of Hamamatsu, Shizuoka Prefecture, Japan. It is bordered by Kita-ku and Hamakita-ku in Hamamatsu, the cities of Shimada and Iwata and towns of Mori and Kawanehon in Shizuoka, Shishiro, Tōei and Toyone in Aichi Prefecture and Iida and Tenryū in Nagano Prefecture.

Tenryū Ward was established on April 1, 2007. It consists of five former cities, towns and villages, including the former city of Tenryū, and towns of Sakuma, Haruno and Misakubo that had previously merged into Hamamatsu on July 1, 2005.

Tenryū Ward is the largest of Hamamatsu’s seven wards in terms of area. Its population density of 28.9 people per km² is very low. The ward had a population of 34,936 and an area of 944.00 km² in 2009. It's heavily forested, contributing to forestry, which is one of the principal industries of Hamamatsu. There are also many dams on the upper reaches of the Tenryū River, providing hydroelectric power to the Chubu Electric Power Company grid.

Tenryū Ward is served by 13 stations on the Iida Line of the Central Japan Railway Company, 3 stations on the Tenryū Hamanako Railroad Tenryū Hamanako Line and one station on the Enshū Railway Line.

Geography

Climate
Tenryū Ward has a climate characterized by hot and humid summers, and relatively mild winters (Köppen climate classification Cfa).

References

External links

 浜松市／天竜区役所 

Wards of Hamamatsu